is a Japanese wrestler. He competed at the 1964 Summer Olympics and the 1968 Summer Olympics.

References

1940 births
Living people
Japanese male sport wrestlers
Olympic wrestlers of Japan
Wrestlers at the 1964 Summer Olympics
Wrestlers at the 1968 Summer Olympics
Sportspeople from Wakayama Prefecture
20th-century Japanese people